Nanqiaosi station is a station on Loop line of Chongqing Rail Transit in Chongqing municipality, China. It is located in Jiangbei District and opened as an infill station in 2019.

Station structure
There are 2 island platforms at this station, located separately on two floors. On each floor, only one side of the platform is used for local trains to stop, while express trains passing through the other side.

References

Railway stations in Chongqing
Railway stations in China opened in 2019
Chongqing Rail Transit stations